Kokolakis is a Greek surname. Notable people with the surname include:

Dimitris Kokolakis (born 1949), Greek basketball player
Georgios Kokolakis (born 1960), Greek footballer and scout

Greek-language surnames